Kazinovka is a rural locality (a settlement) in Rostashevskoye Rural Settlement, Paninsky District, Voronezh Oblast, Russia. The population was 83 as of 2010. There are 3 streets.

Geography 
Kazinovka is located 10 km west of Panino (the district's administrative centre) by road. Bereznyagi is the nearest rural locality.

References 

Rural localities in Paninsky District